Apriona submaculosa is a species of beetle in the family Cerambycidae. It was described by Pic in 1917. It is known from Vietnam.

References

Batocerini
Beetles described in 1917